Elephant Boy was a 1973 Australian-British-German series based on the Rudyard Kipling story Toomai of the Elephants.

It was shot on location in Sri Lanka from December 1971 to April 1972 and consisted of 13 episodes.

It aired on Channel Seven in Australia in 1973.

Plot
The story of a 12 year old, Toomai, his younger brother Ranjit, and their friendship with an elephant.

References

External links

Australian television shows
Works based on The Jungle Book
Television series about children
Television series about brothers
Television series about elephants